Geta may refer to:

Places
Geta (woreda), a woreda in Ethiopia's Southern Nations, Nationalities, and Peoples' Region
Geta, Åland, a municipality in Finland
Geta, Nepal, a town in Attariya Municipality, Kailali District, Seti Zone, Nepal
Getå, a minor locality in Norrköping Municipality, Sweden

Other uses
Geta (comedy), a medieval poem
 Geta (footwear), a type of Japanese footwear
 Geta symbol (〓), a Japanese typographic symbol
 Gta’ language, a Munda language of India
Courtship Rite or Geta, a 1982 science fiction novel by Donald Kingsbury
getaproduction.com

People with the name
Geta (emperor) (189–211), Roman emperor from 209 to 211
Gaius Vitorius Hosidius Geta, Roman priest and grandson of Gnaeus Hosidius Geta
Gnaeus Hosidius Geta (c. AD 20 – after 95), Roman senator and general
Hosidius Geta (2nd–3rd century), Roman playwright
Lucius Lusius Geta (1st century), Roman governor of Egypt

See also
 Getas (Γέτας), a Thracian king
 Publius Septimius Geta (disambiguation)